Three Forks is an unincorporated community in Pennington County, South Dakota, United States. It lies at the intersection of U.S. Routes 16 and 385, just north of Hill City along Spring Creek. A small general store featuring fuel is open year-round; other businesses are open seasonally, including a campground, a motel, a miniature golf-course, and an ice-cream stand. The campground is the site of an annual Octoberfest event, and the area is heavily patronized during the Sturgis Motorcycle Rally in August of each year. In recent years, considerable residential development of the immediate area has swollen its population.

From Three Forks:
East (US 16) to the Keystone Wye and Rapid City.
North (US 385) to Sheridan Lake, Lead, and Deadwood.
South (US 16 and US 385 multiplexed) to Hill City and Custer.

Three Forks is one of several places in the Black Hills where there are two routes indicated by highway signage directing travelers to Mount Rushmore National Memorial.

See also
 Keystone Wye
 Four Corners, Wyoming
 Maverick Junction, South Dakota
 Mule Creek Junction, Wyoming
 Cheyenne Crossing, South Dakota
 Four Mile, South Dakota
 Carlile Junction, Wyoming

Unincorporated communities in Pennington County, South Dakota
Rapid City, South Dakota metropolitan area
Black Hills
Unincorporated communities in South Dakota